Maharashtra State Election Commission is an independent agency of Government of Maharashtra established on 26 April 1994. It conducts rural and urban local body elections in the state of Maharashtra.

Shri Dr. D. N. chaudhari was the first election commissioner of maharashtra from 26 April 1994 to 25 April 1999. after him, Y.L. Rajvade, Shri Nandlal, Nila satyanarayan, Jogeshwar sahariya, and now U p s madan.

References 

State agencies of Maharashtra
State Election Commissioners of India
Local elections in Maharashtra
1994 establishments in Maharashtra
Government agencies established in 1994